Khetia is a town and a nagar panchayat (municipal council) in the Barwani district in the Indian central western state of Madhya Pradesh.

Demographics
In the 1990 census of India, Khetia had a population of 14,265. Males constituted 52% and females 48%. Khetia had an average literacy rate of 66%, higher than the national average of 59.5%: male literacy was 75% and female literacy was 58%. 15% of the population was below age six.

As of the 2011 Census of India the population was 15,744, with 8,148 (51.7%) male and 7.596 (48.2%) female; the average literacy rate was 70.1%, with male literacy at 75.6% and female literacy at 64.3%. 12.9% of the population was below age six.

References

Cities and towns in Barwani district
Barwani